The Golden Notebook is a 1962 novel by the British writer Doris Lessing. Like her two books that followed, it enters the realm of what Margaret Drabble in The Oxford Companion to English Literature called Lessing's "inner space fiction"; her work that explores mental and societal breakdown. The novel contains anti-war and anti-Stalinist messages, an extended analysis of communism and the Communist Party in England from the 1930s to the 1950s, and an examination of the budding sexual revolution and women's liberation movements.

In 2005, TIME magazine called The Golden Notebook one of the 100 best English-language novels since 1923. It has been translated into a number of other languages, including French, Polish, Italian, Swedish, Hungarian, and Hebrew.

Plot summary
The Golden Notebook is the story of writer Anna Wulf, the four notebooks in which she records her life, and her attempt to tie them together in a fifth, gold-coloured notebook.

The book intersperses segments of an ostensibly realistic narrative of the lives of Anna and her friend Molly Jacobs as well as their children, ex-husbands and lovers—entitled Free Women—with excerpts from Anna's four notebooks, coloured black (of Anna's experience in Southern Rhodesia, before and during World War II, which inspired her own best-selling novel), red (of her experience as a member of the Communist Party), yellow (an ongoing novel that is being written based on the painful ending of Anna's own love affair), and blue (Anna's personal journal where she records her memories, dreams, and emotional life).

Each notebook is returned to four times, interspersed with episodes from Free Women, creating non-chronological, overlapping sections that interact with one another. This post-modern styling, with its space for "play" engaging the characters and readers, is among the most famous features of the book, although Lessing insisted that readers and reviewers pay attention to the serious themes in the novel.

Major themes

Lessing, in her preface, claimed that the most important theme in the novel is fragmentation; the mental breakdown that Anna suffers, perhaps from the compartmentalization of her life reflected in the division of the four notebooks but also reflecting the fragmentation of society. Anna's relationship and attempt to draw everything together in the golden notebook at the end of the novel are both the final stage of her intolerable mental breakdown, and her attempt to overcome the fragmentation and madness.

Characters
Anna (Freeman) Wulf:  Writer.  Main character of Free Women and writer of the Notebooks.
Max Wulf:  Anna's ex-husband
Janet Wulf:  Anna and Max's daughter
Molly Jacobs:  Actress, Anna's friend.
Richard Portmain:  Molly's ex-husband
Tommy Portmain:  Molly's -- and Richard's -- son
Marion Portmain:  Richard's second wife
Michael:  Anna's former lover
Willi (Wilhelm) Rodde (Black Notebook):  Anna's boyfriend, refugee from Germany, based on Max Wulf.
Paul Blackenhurst (Black Notebook):  Royal Air Force Pilot
Ted Brown (Black Notebook):  Royal Air Force pilot, socialist.
Jimmy McGrath (Black Notebook):  Royal Air Force pilot.  Homosexual.
George Hounslow (Black Notebook):  Worked on roads.
Maryrose (Black Notebook):  Paul and George's love interest, born in Southern Rhodesia
Mr Boothby (Black Notebook):  Proprietor of the Mashopi Hotel
Mrs Boothby (Black Notebook):  Proprietor of the Mashopi Hotel
June Boothby (Black Notebook):  Daughter of Mr & Mrs Boothby
Jackson (Black Notebook):  Cook at the Mashopi Hotel.  Friend of Jimmy.  
Marie (Black Notebook):  Jackson's wife.  Has an affair with George.
Ella (Yellow Notebook):  Based on Anna Wulf. Writes for a women's magazine.
Julia (Yellow Notebook):  Based on Molly Jacobs
Dr West (Yellow Notebook):  Writes a medical column under the name Dr Allsop for the women's magazine.
Patricia Brent (Yellow Notebook): Editor
George (Yellow Notebook):  Based on Max Wulf
Paul Tanner (Yellow Notebook):  Ella's lover
Michael (Yellow Notebook):  Ella's son
Saul Green (Blue and Golden Notebooks):  American writer
Milt (Free Women 5):  American writer (= Saul Green from the Blue and Golden Notebooks)
Mother Sugar (Mrs Marks):  Anna and Molly's psychoanalyst
Tom Mathlong (Free Women):  African political activist
Charlie Themba (Free Women 4):  Trade union leader, friend of Tom Mathlong

Translations
Translations include:
 Le Carnet d'or (éditions Albin Michel, 1976)  [French].
 Il taccuino d'oro (Feltrinelli, 1989)  [Italian].
 Den femte sanningen, trans. by Mårten Edlund (1964) [Swedish].
 Az arany jegyzetfüzet, trans. by Tábori Zoltán (Ulpius-ház, 2008),  [Hungarian].
 מחברת הזהב (Am Oved, 1978),  [Hebrew].
 "Złoty notes", trans. by Bohdan Maliborski (2014)  [Polish].

References

External links
"Full text of Doris Lessing's The Golden Notebook, with annotations for an internet reading group"  – website created as an experiment in online collaborative reading
Guarded welcome – an article by Doris Lessing
Fragmentation and Integration. A Critical Study of Doris Lessing, The Golden Notebook by Nan Bentzen Skille, Universitetet i Bergen 1977 [ALAS, THIS LINK DOESNOT WORK ANYMORE! ]

1962 British novels
Feminist novels
Novels by Doris Lessing
Metafictional novels
Novels about writers
Michael Joseph books